The Squeaker is a 1927 crime novel by the British writer Edgar Wallace., published in the US as The Squealer in 1928. In the story, an ex-detective goes undercover to find out the identity of a notorious informer who betrays his criminal associates to the police for his own gain.

Film adaptations
The novel has been adapted for the screen several times:
 The Squeaker (1930 film), a British film
 The Squeaker (1931 film), a German film
 The Squeaker (1937 film), a British film
 The Squeaker (1963 film), a West German film

References

Bibliography
 Bergfelder, Tim. International Adventures: German Popular Cinema and European Co-Productions in the 1960s. Berghahn Books, 2005.
 Goble, Alan. The Complete Index to Literary Sources in Film. Walter de Gruyter, 1999.

External links
 

1927 British novels
British novels adapted into films
Novels by Edgar Wallace
Novels set in London
Hodder & Stoughton books
Doubleday, Doran books